Fung Permadi (born 30 December 1967 in Purwokerto, Indonesia) is a former male Chinese Indonesian badminton player. He was a singles specialist who played first for Indonesia and later for Chinese Taipei.

Career
Though Permadi had demonstrated impressive ability by 1990, he was often passed over in selection for international play at a time when Indonesia had elite world class singles players such as Ardy Wiranata, Alan Budikusuma, Joko Suprianto, Hariyanto Arbi, and Hermawan Susanto. Moving to Taiwan in the middle of the decade, Permadi played perhaps his best badminton in the late 1990s, after his thirtieth birthday. He won a number of significant international titles (as shown by the chart below), and at thirty-one was runner-up to China's Sun Jun at the 1999 IBF World Championships. He competed for Chinese Taipei at the 2000 Summer Olympics in the badminton men's singles event.

Achievements

World Championships 
Men's singles

Asian Championships 
Men's singles

Asian Cup 
Men's singles

East Asian Games 
Men's singles

IBF World Grand Prix 
The World Badminton Grand Prix sanctioned by International Badminton Federation (IBF) from 1983 to 2006.

Men's singles

References

 Smash: Fung Permadi
 BWF Player Profile

External links
 
 
 
 

1967 births
Living people
Taiwanese male badminton players
Taiwanese people of Indonesian descent
Indonesian male badminton players
Indonesian people of Chinese descent
Olympic badminton players of Taiwan
Badminton players at the 2000 Summer Olympics
Asian Games competitors for Indonesia
Badminton players at the 1998 Asian Games
Badminton players at the 2002 Asian Games
World No. 1 badminton players
People from Banyumas Regency
Sportspeople from Central Java